Mary Foy may refer to:
 Mary Foy (librarian) (1862–1962), first woman head librarian of the Los Angeles Public Library
 Mary Lou Foy (born 1944), American photojournalist
 Mary Foy (politician), British politician and Labour Party MP for the City of Durham since 2019